The Association of Professional Ball Players of America (APBPA) is a United States-based charity set up in 1924 to assist professional baseball players.  The organization caters to players from all leagues, including the minor leagues. The organization was started by 12 former players in Los Angeles and now has over 101,000 members. Babe Ruth, Lou Gehrig, and other stars of the 1920s spearheaded the development of the APBPA to help former players who were in need financially or experiencing illness or injuries.

History
The proceeds from the 1934 Major League Baseball (MLB) All-Star Game, which was estimated at $45,000–50,000, went to the APBPA. The 1935 MLB All-Star Game in Cleveland, Ohio took in $92,692 in proceeds for the APBPA. In 1941, the Pacific Coast League (PCL) held its first annual PCL All-Star Game and the proceeds for the game were donated to the APBPA.

In 1982, the Old Timers Baseball Classic was created. The event, which was a game between two teams made up of retired baseball players, was sponsored by Cracker Jack and took place in Washington, D.C., at Robert F. Kennedy Memorial Stadium. Part of the proceeds from the game, which was attended by 29,196 people, went to the APBPA. The game became an annual event and parts of the games proceeds went to the APBPA until at least 1989.

A 1986 profile of the APBPA by Los Angeles Times sportswriter Chris Dufresne detailed acts of charity by the organization and expounded upon how they distributed funds. Players were allowed to start taking assistance before their Major League Baseball Players Association pension kicked in at 45 years of age.

The APBPA takes membership dues from professional baseball players and issues membership cards. Pete Coscarart was issued an APBPA "Gold Card" which allowed him free admittance to professional baseball games.

An award given out by the APBPA known as the Chuck Stevens Award, named for the organization's former secretary-treasurer, is given out annually to the best minor league baseball player from Southern California. While in past years the APBPA did not assist players who were experiencing drug addiction, the association currently offers assistance for former players with problems with drug, alcohol, and other addictions and has recently appointed a Director of Addiction Services to help former players. 

Kameron Loe serves APBPA as a Board Member and President of the Association providing charismatic leadership and direction as the Association approaches its 100th Anniversary in 2024.  The 2022 APBPA Board of Directors is composed of Tony LaRussa, Howie Bedell, Ray King, Manny Parra, Steve Bumbry, Dr. Erin Shannon and Kevin Simmons.  Former noted Board Members are Tom Gamboa, Brooks Robinson, Dr. Drayton "Smoke" Patterson, the first Ph.D. Psychologist to sign a Professional Minor League Player/Manager contract (Mid-America League), as the Director of Mental Health Services and Resources and an Ambassador for the APBPA. According to Roland Hemond in 2012, the APBPA has helped 3,000 professional baseball players. In 2012, the APBPA announced it would be offering long-term care insurance through LTC Financial Partners to 11,000 of its members. The APBPA does not publicize their charity work for the privacy of its members.

References

External links
 Official Page

Charities based in California
Baseball organizations